Events from the year 1901 in the United States.

Incumbents

Federal Government 
 President: William McKinley (R-Ohio) (until September 14), Theodore Roosevelt (R-New York) (starting September 14)
 Vice President:
 until March 4: vacant
 March 4–September 14: Theodore Roosevelt (R-New York)
 starting September 14: vacant
 Chief Justice: Melville Fuller (Illinois)
 Speaker of the House of Representatives: David B. Henderson (R-Iowa)
 Congress: 56th (until March 4), 57th (starting March 4)

Events

January–March
 January 1 – Pentecostalism is born, at a prayer meeting at Bethel Bible College in Topeka, Kansas.
 January 3 – Census Commissioner predicts a US population of at least 300 million by 2001
 January 5 – Typhoid fever breaks out in a Seattle jail, the first of two typhoid outbreaks in the United States during the year.
 January 7 – Alferd Packer is released from prison in the United States after serving 18 years for cannibalism.
 January 10 – In the first great Texas gusher, oil is discovered at Spindletop in Beaumont, Texas.
 January 22 – The Grand Opera House in Cincinnati, Ohio, is destroyed in a fire.
 January 28 – Baseball's American League declares itself a Major League.
 February 4 – Puccini's Tosca makes its U.S. debut at the Metropolitan Opera in New York. 
 February 5
The Hay–Pauncefote Treaty is signed by the United Kingdom and United States, ceding control of the Panama Canal to the United States.
J. P. Morgan buys mines and steel mills in the United States, marking the first billion-dollar business deal.
In Evansville, Indiana, a fire burns through the business district, causing $175,000 of damage.
 February 20 – The Hawaii Territory Legislature convenes for the first time.
 February 25 – U.S. Steel, the first billion-dollar corporation and at some time the world's largest producer of steel, is incorporated by industrialist J. P. Morgan.
 March 2
 The U.S. Congress passes the Platt Amendment, limiting the autonomy of Cuba as a condition for the withdrawal of American troops.
 The Carnegie Steel Company with the Illinois Steel Company and The National Steel Company merge to form the United States Steel Corporation.
 March 4 – President William McKinley begins his second term; Theodore Roosevelt is sworn in as Vice President.
 March 9 – The Olds Motor Co. factory in Lansing, Michigan, burns to the ground; it is reconstructed with the world's first automobile assembly line for production of the Oldsmobile Curved Dash.

April–June

 April 25 – New York State becomes the first to require automobile license plates.
 May – Monte Ne health resort opens in the Ozarks.
 May 3 – The Great Fire of 1901 in Jacksonville, Florida, begins.
 May 17 – The U.S. stock market crashes for the first time.
 May 27 – The Edison Storage Battery Company is founded in New Jersey.
 May 28 – Cherry v. Des Moines Leader is decided in the Iowa Supreme Court, upholding the right to publish critical reviews.
 June 12 – Cuba becomes a U.S. protectorate.

July–September

 June 22 to July 31 – The worst heat wave in U.S. history until the 1930s, affecting most areas east of the 100th meridian, is estimated to have killed over 9,500 people.
 July 1 – The Bureau of Chemistry is established within the United States Department of Agriculture.
 July 24 – Author O. Henry is released from prison in Columbus, Ohio after serving 3 years for embezzlement from the First National Bank in Austin, Texas.
 August 10 – U.S. Steel recognition strike of 1901: Members of the Amalgamated Association of Iron, Steel, and Tin Workers begin a strike against United States Steel Corporation after failing to reach a settlement of their demands, and 14,000 employees walk off of the job.
 September 2 – Vice President Theodore Roosevelt utters the famous phrase, "Speak softly and carry a big stick" at the Minnesota State Fair.
 September 5 – The National Association of Professional Baseball Leagues (later renamed Minor League Baseball) is formed in Chicago.
 September 6 – American anarchist Leon Czolgosz shoots President William McKinley at the Pan-American Exposition in Buffalo, New York. McKinley dies 8 days later.
 September 7 – The Boxer Protocol is signed between the Qing Empire of China and the Eight-Nation Alliance.
 September 14 – Vice President Theodore Roosevelt becomes the 26th President of the United States, upon the death of President William McKinley.
 September 26 – The body of President Abraham Lincoln is exhumed and reinterred in concrete several feet thick.

October–December
 October 4 – The American yacht Columbia defeats the Irish Shamrock in the America's Cup yachting race.
 October 16 – President Theodore Roosevelt invites African American leader Booker T. Washington to the White House. The American South reacts angrily to the visit, and racial violence increases in the region.
 October 23 – Yale University celebrates its bicentennial.
 October 24 – Michigan schoolteacher Annie Taylor goes down Niagara Falls in a barrel and survives.
 October 29 – In Amherst, New Hampshire, nurse Jane Toppan is arrested for murdering the Davis family of Boston with an overdose of morphine.
 October 29 – Leon Czolgosz, the assassin of William McKinley, is executed by electrocution.
 November 1 – Sigma Phi Epsilon is founded in Richmond, Virginia.
 November 15 – The Alpha Sigma Alpha fraternity is founded at Longwood University.
 November 28 – The new state constitution of Alabama requires voters to have passed literacy tests.
 December 3 – President Theodore Roosevelt delivers a 20,000-word speech to the House of Representatives asking Congress to curb the power of trusts "within reasonable limits."

Undated
 The Intercollegiate Prohibition Association is established in Chicago.
 Force (cereal) first produced.

Ongoing
 Progressive Era (1890s–1920s)
 Lochner era (c. 1897–c. 1937)
 Philippine–American War (1899–1902)

Births
 January 2 – Bob Marshall, wilderness activist, founder of The Wilderness Society (died 1939)
 January 3 – Henrietta Bingham, journalist, newspaper executive, horse-breeder and anglophile (died 1968)
 January 4 – Raoul Berger, Ukrainian-born attorney and law professor (died 2000)
 January 9 – Chic Young, cartoonist (died 1973)
 February 1
 Howard I. Chapelle, naval architect, museum curator and author (died 1975)
 Clark Gable, actor (died 1960)
 February 8 – Virginius Dabney, teacher, journalist, writer and editor (died 1995)
 February 9 – Brian Donlevy, actor (died 1972)
 February 10 – Stella Adler, actress and teacher (died 1992)
 March 24 – Ub Iwerks, animator, cartoonist, character designer, inventor and special effects technician (died 1971)
 May 8 – Turkey Stearnes, baseball player (died 1979)
 July 3 – Ruth Crawford Seeger, modernist composer and folk music arranger (died 1953)
 July 9 – Jester Hairston, actor and composer (died 2000)
 July 14 – George Tobias, actor (died 1980)
 July 22 – Pancho Barnes, pioneer aviator (died 1975)
 July 30 – John A. Carroll, U.S. Senator from Colorado from 1957 to 1963 (died 1983)
 August 3 – John C. Stennis, U.S. Senator from Mississippi from 1947 to 1989 (died 1995)
 August 4 – Louis Armstrong, jazz trumpeter (died 1971)
 August 8 – Ernest Lawrence, nuclear physicist, winner of the Nobel Prize in Physics in 1939 (died 1958)
 August 23 – John Sherman Cooper, U.S. Senator from Kentucky 1946-1949, 1952-1955 and 1956-1973 (died 1991)
 September 28 – Ed Sullivan, entertainment writer and television host (died 1974)
 December 5 – Walt Disney, animator, producer, director, screenwriter, voice actor and business magnate (died 1966)
 December 12 – Fred Barker, criminal member of the Barker-Karpis gang, son of Ma Barker (killed 1935)
 December 16 – Margaret Mead, cultural anthropologist and author (died 1978)

Deaths
 January 6 – James W. Bradbury, United States Senator from Maine from 1847 to 1853 (born 1802)
 January 16
 Murray Hall, born Mary Anderson, bail bondsman and politician (born 1841 in Scotland)
 Hiram Rhodes Revels, first African American senator (born 1827)
 January 21 – Elisha Gray, inventor and co-founder of Western Electric Manufacturing Company (born 1835)
 January 29 – Alexander H. Jones, Congressional Representative from North Carolina (born 1822)
 February 7 – Rowena Granice Steele, first female novelist in California (born 1824)
 February 18 – Anna Gardner, abolitionist (born 1816)
 March 7 – Ruth Alice Armstrong, American social activist (born 1850)
 March 13 – Benjamin Harrison, 23rd President of the United States from 1889 to 1893 and U.S. Senator from Indiana from 1881 to 1887 (born 1833)
 March 18 – Patrick Donahoe, businessman, publisher of the Boston Catholic newspaper The Pilot (born 1811)
 April 10 – Harriet Newell Kneeland Goff, reformer (born 1828)
 April 19 – Alfred Horatio Belo, newswriter and businessman, founder of The Dallas Morning News (born 1839)
 April 26 – Harriett Ellen Grannis Arey, educator (born 1819)
 June 2 – James A. Herne, playwright and actor (born 1839)
 July 4
 John Fiske, historian and philosopher (born 1842)
 Julian Scott, artist and Civil War Medal of Honor recipient (born 1846)
 July 30 – Herbert Baxter Adams, educator and historian (born 1850)
 August 4 – Harriet Pritchard Arnold, author (born 1858)
 August 24 – Clara Maass, nurse (born 1876)
 September 14 – William McKinley, 25th President of the United States from 1897 to 1901 (born 1843)
 October 10 – Lorenzo Snow, 5th President of the Church of Jesus Christ of Latter-day Saints (born 1814)
 October 21 – James A. Walker, Confederate general and US Congressman (born 1832)
 October 29 – Leon Czolgosz, assassin of President William McKinley (born 1873)
 November 8 – Mary Ann Bickerdyke, nurse and hospital administrator for Union soldiers (born 1817)
 November 26 – John Denny, buffalo soldier and Medal of Honor recipient (born 1846)
 November 27 – Clement Studebaker, automobile manufacturer (born 1831)

See also
 List of American films of 1901
 Timeline of United States history (1900–1929)

References

Further reading
 . (Covers events May 1898-June 1905)

External links
 

 
1900s in the United States
United States
United States
Years of the 20th century in the United States